Philip Emeka Njoku (born 3 June 1996) is a Nigerian professional footballer who plays as a striker.

Career
Njoku has played for Inter Turku, ÅIFK and Minerva Punjab.

References

1996 births
Living people
Nigerian footballers
FC Inter Turku players
Åbo IFK players
RoundGlass Punjab FC players
Gönyeli S.K. players
Veikkausliiga players
Kakkonen players
Association football forwards
Nigerian expatriate footballers
Nigerian expatriate sportspeople in Finland
Nigerian expatriate sportspeople in India
Nigerian expatriate sportspeople in Cyprus
Expatriate footballers in Finland
Expatriate footballers in India
Expatriate footballers in Cyprus